Frida Konstantin (1884–1918) was an Austrian-Hungarian artist.

Biography
Konstantin née Lohwag was born on 10 May 1884 in Vienna, Austria. She was a co-founder of the Hungarian artists' association Kéve and was included in the group's exhibitions. She died in Budapest on 29 December 1918.

Legacy
Her work was included in the 2019 exhibition City Of Women: Female artists in Vienna from 1900 to 1938 at the Österreichische Galerie Belvedere.

Gallery

References

External links
  

1884 births
1918 deaths
Austro-Hungarian painters

Artists from Vienna